The men's C-1 1000 metres event was an open-style, individual canoeing event conducted as part of the Canoeing at the 1972 Summer Olympics program.

Medallists

Results

Heats
Thirteen competitors were entered. Held on September 5, the top three in each heat move on to final with the others were relegated to the semifinal. Ivan Patzaichin broke his paddle and placed last in his heat. Yet he managed to finish the race, paddling with a peace of wood that he removed from the floor of his canoe, and was included to the repechage.

Semifinal
Only the seven canoeists who did not advance from the first round competed in the semifinal. Taking place on September 8, the top three finishers advanced to the final.

Final
The final took place on September 9.

References

External links
1972 Summer Olympics official report Volume 3. p. 493. 

Men's C-1 1000
Men's events at the 1972 Summer Olympics